"Michael Finnegan" (variant spellings include Michael Finnagen and Michael Vinnegan) is an unboundedly long song. The origin of the words and music is unknown, but the tune bears similarity to "Here We Go Round the Mulberry Bush".  The earliest documented reference is The Hackney Scout Song Book (Stacy & Son Ltd, 1921).  It also appears in The Oxford song book, vol.2, collected and arranged by Thomas Wood (Oxford University Press, 1927). 

Irish children's songs
Songs about fictional male characters
Irish folk songs
Traditional children's songs